The 2015 Transplant Games (Spanish: Juegos Mundiales para Transplantados) were a multi-sport event held from 23 to 30 August 2015 in Mar del Plata, Argentina. They were the 20th edition of the World Transplant Games.

The Games were organized by the World Transplant Games Federation (WTGF), the Ministry of Social Development and the Ministry of Health of Argentina.

Participating nations

Sports

  Athletics
  Table tennis
  Swimming
  Volleyball
  Triathlon
  Badminton
  Bowling
  Golf
  Squash
  Tennis
  Cycling
  Tejo
  Marathon (5 km)
  Pétanque

Medal table
Medals were awarded to the following countries:

See also
2013 Youth Parapan American Games

References

External links
 Official site

Multi-sport events in Argentina
Sport in Mar del Plata
World Transplant Games
2015 in multi-sport events
2015 in Argentine sport
August 2015 sports events in South America